Time in Togo is given by Greenwich Mean Time (GMT; UTC±00:00). Togo has never observed daylight saving time and adopted this time zone in 1907.

IANA time zone database 
In the IANA time zone database, Togo is given one zone in the file zone.tab – Africa/Lome. "TG" refers to the country's ISO 3166-1 alpha-2 country code. Data for Togo directly from zone.tab of the IANA time zone database; columns marked with * are the columns from zone.tab itself:

References

External links 
Current time in Togo at Time.is
Time in Togo at TimeAndDate.com

Time in Togo